Sultan Alauddin Sulaiman Shah is the fifth Sultan of Selangor. He married eleven times in his lifetime and had 44 children out of the marriages. He practiced polygamy, but per Islamic marital jurisprudence, he did not have more than four wives in the same time. He had altogether 26 sons, 18 daughters and at least one adopted daughter. He had at least one child from each marriage except from his third marriage, with a commoner, Hajah Sofia binti Haji Abdul Ghani, from which they have no child.

Background
Sulaiman of Selangor was officially installed as Sultan of Selangor on 22 October 1903, despite already being proclaimed in 1899. On 4 November 1903, he gave titles to all his five children with his first royal consort, Tunku Maharum as a symbol to elevate their status. His son, Tengku Musaeddin was given the title Tengku Putera Mahkota, while his four daughters, Tengku Maheran, Tengku Fatimah, Tengku Arfah and Tengku Zahrah were given the title Tengku Puteri. On 5 November 1903, he decreed that all his descendants will carry the hereditary first name Tengku instead of Raja.

Tengku Musaeddin, as the eldest son, was made Raja Muda (the crown prince) on 1920 but he was dismissed from his position on 1934 after he was accused of misbehaving by British Resident, Theodore Samuel Adams (1885  1961; in office 1935  1937). His accusation of the prince being a gambling addict among others was noted by historian as unconvincing and it was theorised that Adams was angry that Tengku Musaeddin refused to follow Adam's order. Tengku Alam Shah, Sulaiman's third son, was made Raja Muda on 20 July 1936 instead, overtaking his elder brother, Tengku Badar Shah. Nevertheless, both Tengku Alam Shah and Tengku Musaeddin became the sixth and seventh Sultan of Selangor, taking the regnal name Sultan Hisamuddin Alam Shah and Sultan Musa Ghiatuddin Riayat Shah respectively.

Two of Sulaiman's daughters became queen consorts. Tengku Puteri Zahrah became the queen consort of Langkat after marrying Sultan Abdul Aziz, the Sultan of Langkat, and was given the title Tengku Permaisuri Zahrah. Tengku Raihani married Sultan Sir Ahmad Tajuddin of Brunei as his second wife, taking the title Tengku Ampuan Raihani, holding the title from 1934 until 1956. She relinquished the title upon remarrying after the Sultan's death.

Some of his grandchildren married each other in cousin marriages. His grandson, Tengku Abdul Aziz, who ascended the throne as the eighth Sultan of Selangor and taking the regnal name Sultan Salahuddin Abdul Aziz Shah married his cousin in his first marriage, Raja Nur Saidatul Ihsan binti Tengku Badar Shah in 1943. The couple later divorced. Later, he married another cousin, Tengku Ampuan Rahimah on 1956 until her death on 1993.

Issues
List of Sulaiman of Selangor's issues and their children in order of their birth dates:

See also
Selangor royal family
Selangor Sultanate

Notes

References

Selangor
Royal House of Selangor
Sulaiman